Taruni Sachdev (14 May 1998 – 14 May 2012) was an Indian child actress. She made her film debut in 2004 with Vellinakshatram, which endeared her to Malayalam audiences. The same year, she appeared in Sathyam and she acted with Prithviraj. She also acted in the Hindi film Paa starring  Amitabh Bachchan in the lead role in 2009. She also appeared in 50+ advertisements for various companies. Her last film was a Tamil film Vetri Selvan (2014), which was released two years after her death. She died in the 2012 Agni Air Dornier 228 crash near Jomsom Airport in Nepal. Her mother also died in the crash.

Personal life 
Taruni Sachdev was born on 14 May 1998 in Mumbai, India, to industrialist Haresh Sachdev and Geeta Sachdev. She studied to class nine at Bai Avabai Framji Petit Girls' High School.

Career
Taruni had dreamt of becoming a heroine. In 2004, she made her debut in Vinayan's comedy-horror Vellinakshatram. Vinayan said Vellinakshatram endeared Taruni to Malayalam audiences. The same year, she appeared in the action thriller Sathyam.

Director Vinayan had spotted Taruni in an advertisement with Amitabh Bachchan and contacted Bachchan's manager to cast her in his films. He recalls: "We were all amazed by the manner in which she performed. She was just five then and could render Malayalam dialogues after listening to it for a couple of times. I still remember the intensity with which she performed in the climax of the film, where even senior actors found it difficult to work against high-speed propellers".

In 2009, Taruni appeared in R. Balki's comedy-drama Paa, where she starred as Somi, Amitabh Bachchan's classmate. India Today said she "shot to fame" after appearing in the film.

Besides acting, Taruni appeared in more than fifty commercials, including television advertisements for Colgate, ICICI Bank, Parachute, Saffola oil, and Kesar Badam Milk. She is best remembered for doing Rasna commercials with the actress Karisma Kapoor, and was nicknamed the "Rasna girl". She also appeared on the television game show Kya Aap Paanchvi Pass Se Tez Hain?.

Her last film was the Tamil drama-thriller Vetri Selvan, which was released in 2014. Taruni had completed most of her part; director Rudhran stated that her footage would be retained "as a remembrance of the prodigy" and that the rest of her role would be patched up during the post-production.

Death
Taruni Sachdev died in the Agni Air Dornier 228 crash near Jomsom Airport in Nepal on 14 May 2012, on her 14th birthday. Taruni's mother Geetha Sachdev, who accompanied her on the flight also died.

Taruni's and her mother's body was brought to Mumbai and cremated on 16 May 2012.

Filmography

References

External links

 

1998 births
2012 deaths
21st-century Indian actresses
21st-century Indian child actresses
Actresses from Mumbai
Actresses in Hindi cinema
Actresses in Malayalam cinema
Actresses in Tamil cinema
Child actresses in Hindi cinema
Child actresses in Malayalam cinema
Child actresses in Tamil cinema
Child models
Indian child actresses
Indian film actresses
Indian voice actresses
Victims of aviation accidents or incidents in Nepal
Victims of aviation accidents or incidents in 2012